Charlie Davis (born November 17, 1951) is a former professional American football defensive tackle in the National Football League (NFL). Davis was a 9th round selection (229th overall pick) by the Pittsburgh Steelers out of Texas Christian University in the 1974 NFL Draft. He played for seven seasons in the NFL. He was a back-up defensive tackle for the Steelers and a member of the their first World Championship Super Bowl IX over the Minnesota Vikings, was traded to the St. Louis Cardinals Sep 15 1975, for whom he played from (1975–1979), and the Houston Oilers (1980). Charlie played the best game of his career in the 1975 NFC Divisional Playoffs against the LA Rams when he recorded 5 sacks and recovered a fumble.

His younger half-brother is former Dallas Cowboys' offensive guard Leonard Davis.

References

1951 births
Living people
People from Freestone County, Texas
American football defensive tackles
TCU Horned Frogs football players
Pittsburgh Steelers players
St. Louis Cardinals (football) players
Houston Oilers players